Aspacures III (or Varaz-Bakur II), of the Chosroid Dynasty, was the king of Iberia (Kartli, eastern Georgia) from c. 380 to 394. He was the son and successor of Mirdat III and was married to the daughter of Trdat, his relative and successor. He is credited by the Georgian chronicles with the construction of the church of Tsilkani. During his reign, the Roman Empire signed the Peace of Acilisene with Sassanid Iran in which it admitted to the loss of Iberia and a greater portion of Armenia. His sons were Pharasmanes and Mihrdat.

References

Chosroid kings of Iberia
4th-century monarchs in Asia
Georgians from the Sasanian Empire